(German, 'Steel Helmet Faction') is the hard-line or right-wing faction of a political party, most notably the German CDU. The term refers to the hawkish, i.e. pro-military positions often taken by such groups and comes from the Stahlhelm, the steel helmet historically used by German soldiers. It was originally used of pro-military extremist politicians in the Weimar Republic who were members of the Der Stahlhelm ex-servicemen's organisation.

References

German words and phrases
Militarism
Political party factions in Germany
Right-wing politics in Europe